Irina Teterina (born 7 January 1958) is a Soviet rower. She competed in the women's coxed four event at the 1988 Summer Olympics.

References

1958 births
Living people
Soviet female rowers
Olympic rowers of the Soviet Union
Rowers at the 1988 Summer Olympics
Place of birth missing (living people)